The SNCF locomotives BB 1321 to BB 1324 were a class of 1500 V DC 4 axle electric locomotives originally built for the Chemin de fer de Paris à Orléans in the 1920s.

After incorporation into SNCF the locomotives were used for shunting duties after the late 1940s.

See also
SNCF BB 1-80, SNCF BB 100, SNCF BB 200, SNCF BB 1420 - similar locomotives, part of the same order of 200 locomotives

References

Literature

External links

E.0221
01320
Standard gauge electric locomotives of France
Railway locomotives introduced in 1927

Shunting locomotives
1500 V DC locomotives